James Henry (born 4 February 1949) is a Scottish former football midfielder.

References

External links

1949 births
Living people
Scottish footballers
Forfar Athletic F.C. players
Scottish Football League players
Scottish Football League representative players
Footballers from Dundee
Association football midfielders
Dundee United F.C. players
Aberdeen F.C. players
San Antonio Thunder players
Team Hawaii players
Scottish expatriate footballers
Expatriate soccer players in the United States
North American Soccer League (1968–1984) players
Carnoustie Panmure F.C. players
Scottish expatriate sportspeople in the United States